Hebah Moh'd Helal Taher Fakher Elddin (born 19 November 1990), known as Hebah Fakher Elddin, is a Jordanian footballer who plays as a defender for local Women's League club Shabab Al-Ordon. She has been a member of the Jordan women's national team.

References 

1990 births
Living people
Jordanian women's footballers
Jordan women's international footballers
Women's association football defenders
Footballers at the 2014 Asian Games
Asian Games competitors for Jordan
Jordan Women's Football League players